Acalypha raivavensis is a species of plant in the family Euphorbiaceae. It is endemic to French Polynesia.

See also
Flora of Tubuai

References

raivavensis
Flora of the Tubuai Islands
Critically endangered flora of Oceania
Taxonomy articles created by Polbot
Plants described in 1935